Józef Gałeczka (28 February 1939 – 7 July 2021) was a Polish footballer who played as a forward. He was top scorer in the Ekstraklasa in 1964 with 18 goals.

References

External links
 

1939 births
2021 deaths
Sportspeople from Gliwice
Polish footballers
Association football forwards
Poland international footballers
Piast Gliwice players
Zagłębie Sosnowiec players
US Boulogne players
Ekstraklasa players
Ligue 2 players
Polish football managers
Zagłębie Sosnowiec managers
Polish expatriate footballers
Polish expatriate sportspeople in Australia
Expatriate soccer players in Australia
Polish expatriate sportspeople in France
Expatriate footballers in France